Anthony Henley may refer to:

Anthony Henley (1667–1711), English Member of Parliament
Anthony Henley (died 1748), English Member of Parliament
Anthony Henley (cricketer) (1846–1916), English cricketer
 Anthony Henley, 3rd Baron Henley (1825–1898), British peer and Liberal Member of Parliament